Saint-Raymond/Paquet Aerodrome  is located  east of Saint-Raymond, Quebec, Canada.

Traffic at Saint-Raymond/Paquet airfield is represented mainly by glider operations.

References

Registered aerodromes in Capitale-Nationale